O'Donnell Peak is a peak on the polar plateau, situated 5 nautical miles (9 km) west of Joice Icefall of the Millen Range. Mapped by United States Geological Survey (USGS) from surveys and United States Navy air photos, 1960–64. Named by Advisory Committee on Antarctic Names (US-ACAN) for Frank B. O'Donnell, meteorologist at Hallett Station in 1962.

Mountains of Victoria Land
Pennell Coast